Magnetation is the processing of iron ore tailings, the waste product of iron ore mines, to recover hematite. Crushed mine tailings are mixed with water to create a slurry; the slurry is then pumped through magnetic separation chambers to extract hematite.  Commercial interest in this process stems from the possibility of extracting additional iron from tailings supplied by existing mines, increasing their yield.

References

External links
Magnetation Company Website
July 7th, 2009 Business North article titled "On the Move: Magnetation to Double Iron Recovery"

Metallurgical processes